This is a list of members of the Victorian Legislative Assembly from 2006 to 2010:

 On 6 August 2007, the Labor member for Williamstown and Premier of Victoria, Steve Bracks, resigned. Labor candidate Wade Noonan won the resulting by-election on 15 September 2007.
 On 6 August 2007, the Labor member for Albert Park and Deputy Premier of Victoria, John Thwaites, resigned. Labor candidate Martin Foley won the resulting by-election on 15 September 2007.
 On 2 June 2008, the Labor member for Kororoit, Andre Haermeyer, resigned. Labor candidate Marlene Kairouz won the resulting by-election on 28 June 2008.
 On 18 January 2010, the Labor member for Altona, Lynne Kosky, resigned. Labor candidate Jill Hennessy won the resulting by-election on 13 February 2010.
 On 25 August 2010, the Labor member for Ivanhoe, Craig Langdon, resigned. No by-election was held due to the proximity of the next election.

Members of the Parliament of Victoria by term
21st-century Australian politicians